The 2010 IIFA Awards, officially the 11th International Indian Film Academy Awards ceremony, presented by the International Indian Film Academy honoured the best films of 2009 and took place between 3 – 5 June 2010. The official ceremony took place on 5 June 2010, at the Sugathadasa Stadium in Colombo, Sri Lanka. During the ceremony, IIFA Awards were awarded in 23 competitive categories. The ceremony was televised in India and internationally on Star Plus. The ceremony was hosted by Boman Irani, Ritesh Deshmukh and Lara Dutta.

In related events, the IIFA Music and Fashion Extravaganza took place on 4 June 2010 at the Bandaranaike Memorial International Conference Hall. During the event, all technical awards were presented to the winners.

3 Idiots led the ceremony with 22 nominations, followed by Love Aaj Kal with 12 nominations, and Kaminey and Paa with 9 nominations each.

3 Idiots won 16 awards, including Best Film, Best Director (for Rajkumar Hirani), Best Actress (for Kareena Kapoor), Best Supporting Actor (for Sharman Joshi) and Best Villain (for Boman Irani), thus becoming the most–awarded film at the ceremony.

Other winners were Aladin, Love Aaj Kal and Paa with 3 awards, and All the Best: Fun Begins, Delhi–6, Dev.D, Kal Kissne Dekha, Kaminey and Wake Up Sid with 1 award.

Background
The awards began in 2000 and the first ceremony was held in London at The Millennium Dome. From then on the awards were held at locations around the world signifying the international success of Bollywood. The next award ceremony was announced to be held in Toronto, Ontario, Canada in 2011. The award ceremonies are held in various places around the world.

Winners of and nominees

Winners are listed first and highlighted in boldface.

Popular awards

Musical awards

Backstage awards

Technical awards

Special awards

Green Globe Award
 Vivek Oberoi

Habitat Humanity Ambassadorship Award
 Salman Khan

Outstanding Achievement in  Cinema
 Rakeysh Omprakash Mehra (Indian Cinema – Male)
 Zeenat Aman (Indian Cinema – Female)
 Anil Kapoor (International Cinema)

Multiple nominations and awards

The following eleven films received multiple nominations:
 Twenty-Two: 3 Idiots
 Twelve: Love Aaj Kal
 Nine: Kaminey and Paa
 Eight: Dev.D
 Five: Wake Up Sid and Delhi-6
 Three: Aladin and Wanted
 Two: Gulaal and All the Best: Fun Begins

The following four films received multiple awards:
 Sixteen: 3 Idiots
 Three: Aladin, Love Aaj Kal and Paa

See also
 International Indian Film Academy Awards
 Bollywood
 Cinema of India

References

External links
 IIFA.com Official website

Entertainment events in Sri Lanka
2010 Indian film awards

nl:IIFA-Award
IIFA awards